Joe Pace (born December 18, 1953) is an American former professional basketball player. He played in the NBA for the Washington Bullets and in Italy.

College career
Pace played college basketball at Maryland Eastern Shore and Coppin State.

Professional career
Pace won a league championship with the Washington Bullets in 1977–78.

On August 8, 1978, he signed as a free agent with the Boston Celtics, but walked out of pre-season training camp and was subsequently placed on waivers. In October 1978, he signed with the Baltimore Metros of the Continental Basketball Association. He appeared in 12 games for Baltimore and averaged 17.6 points per game, 2.4 blocks and 8.4 rebounds in 30.8 minutes.

Personal life
In May 2008, he resided at a homeless shelter in Seattle. Shortly after The Seattle Post-Intelligencer documented his troubles, he received an outpouring of support from within the NBA community, and has now found a home.

References

External links
Career stats

1953 births
Living people
African-American basketball players
American expatriate basketball people in Italy
American men's basketball players
Basketball players from New Jersey
Centers (basketball)
Coppin State Eagles men's basketball players
Franklin High School (New Jersey) alumni
Homeless people
Lega Basket Serie A players
Maryland Eastern Shore Hawks men's basketball players
Phoenix Suns draft picks
Sportspeople from Franklin Township, Somerset County, New Jersey
Sportspeople from New Brunswick, New Jersey
Washington Bullets draft picks
Washington Bullets players
21st-century African-American people
20th-century African-American sportspeople